Lasionota is a genus of beetles in the family Buprestidae, tribe Stigmoderini, containing the following species:

 Lasionota acutipennis (Moore, 1997)
 Lasionota apicalis (Kerremans, 1903)
 Lasionota atrocyaneo (Moore, 1997)
 Lasionota bachmanni (Moore, 1997)
 Lasionota bernardi (Théry, 1911)
 Lasionota bifasciatus (Moore, 1986)
 Lasionota bivittatus (Gory & Laporte, 1839)
 Lasionota bonaerensis (Moore, 1997)
 Lasionota bruchi (Kerremans, 1903)
 Lasionota brullei (Gory & Laporte, 1839)
 Lasionota catamarcalis (Moore, 1997)
 Lasionota cobosi (Moore, 1997)
 Lasionota coerulans (Obenberger, 1922)
 Lasionota conjunctus (Chevrolat, 1838)
 Lasionota cupricollis (Gory & Laporte, 1839)
 Lasionota dispar (Kerremans, 1903)
 Lasionota espanoli (Cobos, 1958)
 Lasionota fairmairei (Kerremans, 1897)
 Lasionota javierae (Moore, 1987)
 Lasionota leyboldi (Steinheil, 1874)
 Lasionota millenium (Moore, 2000)
 Lasionota minor (Solier, 1849)
 Lasionota morosus (Gory & Laporte, 1839)
 Lasionota okea (Gory, 1841)
 Lasionota parallelus (Cobos, 1958)
 Lasionota pictus (Gory & Laporte, 1839)
 Lasionota platensis (Moore, 1997)
 Lasionota politus (Moore, 1997)
 Lasionota quadrifasciatus Mannerheim, 1837
 Lasionota quadrizonatus Blanchard, 1846
 Lasionota robustus (Cobos, 1959)
 Lasionota rouletii (Solier, 1849)
 Lasionota rousselii (Solier, 1849)
 Lasionota rubidipennis (Pochon, 1971)
 Lasionota rufocaudalis (Moore, 1986)
 Lasionota rugicollis (Moore, 1997)
 Lasionota spitzi (Théry, 1936)
 Lasionota sulcatus (Moore, 1997)
 Lasionota tetrazonus (Chevrolat, 1838)
 Lasionota tucumanus (Théry, 1911)
 Lasionota vigintiguttatus (Perty, 1830)

References

Buprestidae genera